Women's Downhill World Cup 1981/1982

Calendar

Final point standings

In Women's Downhill World Cup 1981/82 the best 5 results count.

References
 fis-ski.com

External links
 

World Cup
FIS Alpine Ski World Cup women's downhill discipline titles